Stenostiridae, or the fairy flycatchers, are a family of small passerine birds proposed as a result of recent discoveries in molecular systematics. They are also referred to as stenostirid warblers.

Taxonomy and systematics
This new clade is named after the fairy flycatcher, a distinct species placed formerly in the Old World flycatchers. This is united with the "sylvioid flycatchers": the genus Elminia (formerly placed in the Monarchinae) and the closely allied former Old World flycatcher genus Culicicapa, as well as one species formerly believed to be an aberrant fantail.

 Genus  Stenostira – fairy "warbler" or fairy "flycatcher"
 Fairy flycatcher, Stenostira scita
 Genus Elminia (includes Trochocercus)
African blue flycatcher, Elminia longicauda
White-tailed blue flycatcher, Elminia albicauda
Dusky crested flycatcher, Elminia nigromitrata
White-bellied crested flycatcher, Elminia albiventris
White-tailed crested flycatcher, Elminia albonotata
 Genus  Chelidorhynx (formerly in Rhipidura)
 Yellow-bellied fantail, Chelidorhynx hypoxanthus
 Genus Culicicapa
 Grey-headed canary-flycatcher, Culicicapa ceylonensis
 Citrine canary-flycatcher, Culicicapa helianthea

Other African or Asian species might conceivably fall into this novel clade. The tit-flycatchers (Myioparus) are apparently true flycatchers morphologically somewhat convergent to Stenostira.

The Stenostiridae as a whole are related to penduline tits, titmice and chickadees. All these appear to be closer to the Sylvioidea than to other Passerida, but this is not robustly supported by the available data and they might constitute a distinct, more basal superfamily.

References

Footnotes

Sources

 Alström, Per; Ericson, Per G.P.; Olsson, Urban  & Sundberg, Per (2006): Phylogeny and classification of the avian superfamily Sylvioidea. Molecular Phylogenetics and Evolution 38(2): 381–397.  
 Barker, F. Keith; Cibois, Alice; Schikler, Peter A.; Feinstein, Julie & Cracraft, Joel (2004): Phylogeny and diversification of the largest avian radiation. PNAS 101(30): 11040–11045.   PDF fulltext Supporting information
 
 Fuchs, J.; Fjeldså, J.; Bowie, R. C. K.; Voelker, G. & Pasquet, E. (2006): The African warbler genus Hyliota as a lost lineage in the oscine songbird tree: Molecular support for an African origin of the Passerida. Molecular Phylogenetics and Evolution 39(1): 186–197.  (HTML fulltext)
 Jønsson, Knud A. & Fjeldså, Jon (2006): A phylogenetic supertree of oscine passerine birds (Aves: Passeri). Zool. Scripta 35(2): 149–186.  (HTML abstract)